Samuel Dewitt (December 17, 1893 – death unknown) was an American Negro league infielder between 1919 and 1926.

A native of Bristol, Tennessee, Dewitt made his Negro leagues debut in 1919 with the Dayton Marcos. He went on to play for the Indianapolis ABCs, Columbus Buckeyes, Toledo Tigers, and finished his career back in Dayton in 1926.

References

External links
 and Baseball-Reference Black Baseball stats and Seamheads

1893 births
Place of death missing
Year of death missing
Columbus Buckeyes (Negro leagues) players
Dayton Marcos players
Indianapolis ABCs players
Toledo Tigers players
Baseball players from Tennessee
People from Bristol, Tennessee
Baseball infielders